Cenex is a UK agency promoting low-carbon transport technologies

Cenex may also refer to:
 Cenex, brand fuel and convenience stores owned by CHS, Inc.
 Cenex, a brand of latex

See also 
 Senex (disambiguation)
 ODF2, or cenexin, a protein
 Cinex, a Venezuelan cinema chain